EMN may refer to:

 Early Music Network
 Eastman Chemical Company, an American chemical company
 École de management de Normandie, a French business school
 École des mines de Nantes, a French engineering school
 Eman language
 Equity market neutral
 European Migration Network
 Every Mother's Nightmare, an American heavy metal band
 Néma Airport, in Mauretania